Eilean Mhic Chrion is a tidal island sheltering Ardfern in Loch Craignish, Scotland.

Eilean Mhic Chrion is one of 43 tidal islands that can be walked to from the mainland of Great Britain and one of 17 that can be walked to from the Scottish mainland.

Footnotes

Uninhabited islands of Argyll and Bute